Aragua is a state in Venezuela. It may also refer to:

 Aragua de Maturín, a town in Monagas State
 Aragua River, in Aragua State, Venezuela
 Aragua Municipality, Anzoátegui State, Venezuela
 Aragua de Barcelona, Anzoátegui State, Venezuela
 Aragua Fútbol Club
 Aragua glass frog
 Aragua (moth), a genus of moths
 ARV Aragua (D-31), a Venezuelan ship